The Dean of Wakefield is the head (primus inter pares – first among equals) and chair of the chapter of canons, the ruling body of Wakefield Cathedral. The dean and chapter are based at the Cathedral Church of All Saints Wakefield. Before 2000 the post was designated as a provost, which was then the equivalent of a dean at most English cathedrals. The cathedral is one of three co-equal mother churches of the Diocese of Leeds and a seat of the Bishop of Leeds. The current dean is Simon Cowling.

List of provosts and deans

Provosts
1931–1932 William MacLeod
1933–1962 Noel Hopkins
1962–1971 Philip Pare
1972–1982 John Lister
1982–1997 John Allen
1997–2000 George Nairn-Briggs (became Dean)

Deans
2000–2007 George Nairn-Briggs
200726 November 2017 Jonathan Greener (became Dean of Exeter)
2017–2018 (Acting) Tony Macpherson, Sub Dean & Canon Pastor
29 September 2018present Simon Cowling

References

Sources
“Who was Who” 1897-2007 London, A & C Black, 2007  
The Times, Thursday, Nov 10, 1932; pg. 1; Issue 46287; col A Death of the first Provost of Wakefield
Photo of Jonathan Greener
Cathedral web-site

Deans of Wakefield
 
Deans of Wakefield
Diocese of Wakefield
Wakefield, Dean of